The Battle on the Po was a battle of the Wars in Lombardy. It occurred in June 1431, on the Po River, near Cremona. The battle was fought between 85 Venetian galleys, sent towards Cremona to support Count of Carmagnola's army, and a somewhat superior number of Milanese galleys. The Venetians were commanded by Niccolò Trevisani.

The battle resulted in the defeat of the Venetians, who could not be helped by Carmagnola's field army, with a loss of c. 2,500 men, 28 galleys, and 42 transport ships.

See also
Battle of Soncino

Sources

1431 in Europe
1430s in the Holy Roman Empire
15th century in the Republic of Venice
Pavia 1431
Pavia 1431
Pavia 1431
Battles in Lombardy
Conflicts in 1431
Riverine warfare
Po (river)